The Clarence Greenwood Recordings is the third album by American recording artist Citizen Cope. It was released on September 14, 2004 via RCA Records. Originally, The Clarence Greenwood Recordings was scheduled to be released under Arista Records after he was pursued by the company where they bought out his contract with his former label, DreamWorks Records. Arista CEO L.A. Reid - who executive produced the album - left the label amid huge losses before it was released. The move made Citizen Cope an RCA signee when Arista was restructured in 2004.

On August 30, 2019, the RIAA issued a Gold certification for The Clarence Greenwood Recordings fifteen years after its initial release.

Track listing 
All the tracks were written and produced by Clarence Greenwood.

Personnel 

 Clarence Greenwood – main artist, producer, drum machine, fender rhodes, guitar, keyboards, programming, synthesizer bass, turntables
 Rev. Brady Blade – drums
 Aaron Burroughs – handclapping
 Dennis Chambers – drums
 Danny Clinch – photography
 Preston Crump – bass
 Paul "Big Bird" Edwards – drums
 John Ginty – keyboards, organ, synthesizer, synthesizer strings
 Bashiri Johnson – percussion
 Manny Marroquin – mixing
 Alex McKinney – web design
 Meshell Ndegeocello – bass
 Michael Neal – bass, mixing
 Daniel Parker – handclapping, keyboards, piano
 Shawn Pelton – drums
 Neal Pogue – mixing
 Bob Power – bass
 James Poyser – keyboards, piano
 Steve Ralbovsky – A&R
 Keith Robinson – percussion
 Carlos Santana – guitar
 Joshua Sarubin – A&R
 Mike Tocci – mixing
 Steef Van De Gevel – mixing
 Jason Yates – fender rhodes, organ
 Leon Zervos – mastering

Certifications

References 

2004 albums
Citizen Cope albums
RCA Records albums